

Memberships
The following is a list of international organizations in which the United States of America officially participates.

Agreement between the United States of America, the United Mexican States, and Canada (USMCA)
Asian Development Bank (ADB) (nonregional member)
Asia-Pacific Economic Cooperation (APEC)
Association of Southeast Asian Nations (ASEAN) (dialogue partner)
Australia Group
Australia-New Zealand-United States Security Treaty (ANZUS)
Bank for International Settlements (BIS)
Black Sea Economic Cooperation Zone (BSEC) (observer)
C5+1
Colombo Plan (CP)
Council of Europe (CE) (observer)
Council of the Baltic Sea States (CBSS) (observer)
Dominican Republic–Central America Free Trade Agreement (CAFTA-DR)
Euro-Atlantic Partnership Council (EAPC)
European Bank for Reconstruction and Development (EBRD)
European Organization for Nuclear Research (CERN) (observer)
Fédération Internationale de Football Association (FIFA)
Group of Seven (G7)
Group of Ten (G10)
Group of Twenty Finance Ministers and Central Bank Governors (G20)
Inter-American Development Bank (IADB)
International Chamber of Commerce (ICC)
International Criminal Police Organization (Interpol)
International Energy Agency (IEA)
International Energy Forum (IEF)
International Federation of Red Cross and Red Crescent Societies (IFRCS)
International Grains Council (IGC)
International Hydrographic Organization (IHO)
International Mobile Satellite Organization (IMSO)
International Olympic Committee (IOC)
International Organization for Standardization (ISO)
International Red Cross and Red Crescent Movement (ICRM)
International Telecommunications Satellite Organization (ITSO)
International Trade Union Confederation (ITUC)
North Atlantic Treaty Organization (NATO)
Nuclear Energy Agency (NEA)
Nuclear Suppliers Group (NSG)
Organisation for Economic Co-operation and Development (OECD)
Organization for Security and Cooperation in Europe (OSCE)
Organization of American States (OAS)
Pacific Community (SPC)
Pacific Islands Forum (PIF) (partner)
Paris Club
Permanent Court of Arbitration (PCA)
South Asian Association for Regional Cooperation (SAARC) (observer)
Southeast European Cooperative Initiative (SECI) (observer)
United Nations (UN) - Membership in the UN includes participation in the UN's Six Principal Organs: the General Assembly, Secretariat, International Court of Justice, Security Council, Economic and Social Council, and Trusteeship Council.
Food and Agriculture Organization (FAO)
International Atomic Energy Agency (IAEA)
International Civil Aviation Organization (ICAO)
International Fund for Agricultural Development (IFAD)
International Labour Organization (ILO)
International Maritime Organization (IMO)
International Monetary Fund (IMF)
International Organization for Migration (IOM)
International Telecommunication Union (ITU)
Organisation for the Prohibition of Chemical Weapons (OPCW)
Preparatory Commission for the Comprehensive Nuclear-Test-Ban Treaty Organization (CTBTO Preparatory Commission)
United Nations Conference on Trade and Development (UNCTAD)
United Nations High Commissioner for Refugees (UNHCR)
United Nations Human Rights Council (UNHRC)
United Nations Institute for Training and Research (UNITAR)
United Nations Mission for Justice Support in Haiti (MINUJUSTH)
United Nations Relief and Works Agency for Palestine Refugees in the Near East (UNRWA)
United Nations Truce Supervision Organization (UNTSO)
Universal Postal Union (UPU)
World Bank Group (WBG)
International Bank for Reconstruction and Development (IBRD)
International Centre for Settlement of Investment Disputes (ICSID)
International Development Association (IDA)
International Finance Corporation (IFC)
Multilateral Investment Guarantee Agency (MIGA)
World Health Organization (WHO)
World Intellectual Property Organization (WIPO)
World Meteorological Organization (WMO)
World Trade Organization (WTO)
World Customs Organization (WCO)
World Organization of the Scout Movement (WOSM)
World Veterans Federation (WVF)
Zangger Committee (ZC)

Notable Absences 

 International Criminal Court - Signed treaty, but did not ratify (December 31, 2000). Withdrew signature (May 6, 2002)
United Nations Educational, Scientific and Cultural Organization (UNESCO) - Withdrew on December 31, 2018, due to concerns about the organization having an anti-Israel bias.

See also

United States Department of State
Foreign policy of the United States
Foreign relations of the United States
United States and the United Nations
United States Mission to the United Nations
United States withdrawal from the United Nations

References

External links
United States of America website
United States Department of State

United States
Foreign relations of the United States
United States and the United Nations